Anne Gittinger is an American billionaire heiress, the granddaughter of John W. Nordstrom, the co-founder of the Nordstrom department store chain.

Early life
She is the granddaughter of the co-founder of the Nordstrom department store chain, John W. Nordstrom, and the sister of Bruce Nordstrom, the company's former chairman and CEO. She has a degree from the University of Washington.

Career
Gittinger is Nordstorm's largest shareholder after her brother Bruce Nordstrom.

As of March 2019, she had a net worth of $1.3 billion.

Personal life
She was married to D. Wayne Gittinger (1933–2014), a pitcher on the Husky baseball team from Kellogg, Idaho. After graduating from UW in 1954 and its law school in 1957, he was a partner in the Seattle law firm Lane Powell and a former Nordstrom director. They had two children, and lived in Seattle.

References

External links
Canine Companions for Independence – Board and Leadership

1930s births
Living people
American people of Swedish descent
American billionaires
Female billionaires
Nordstrom family